Ghar is an Indian Hindi-language film directed by Manik Chatterjee, released in 1978. It stars Vinod Mehra, Rekha in lead roles. The music was composed by R. D. Burman.

The film was remade in Tamil as Kaadhal Kiligal and in Malayalam as Aa Raathri.

Plot 
Vikas Chandra (Vinod Mehra) and Aarti (Rekha) have recently married and they move into their new apartment. One day they go out to watch a late night Hindi movie at a local cinema theatre. The movie gets over well after midnight and as no cab is found at that hour, they decide to walk home on foot. On the way, they are suddenly waylaid by four men, who assault Vikas, leaving him unconscious and forcibly take Aarti with them. When Vikas regains consciousness he finds himself in hospital with a head wound. He is informed that Aarti is in the same hospital, after being gang-raped and assaulted. This incident makes headlines in the media and is also a subject of discussion by politicians during their election campaign. Vikas feels haunted by this incident and does not know how to act further. Aarti, on the other hand, has been completely traumatised and is unable to trust any male. Now the couple faces a serious crisis leading to a loveless relationship, and only a miracle can bring the old spark back into their married life.

Cast 
 Vinod Mehra as Vikas Chandra
 Rekha as Aarti Chandra
 Prema Narayan as Seema
 Asit Sen as Mr. Chatterjee
 Dinesh Thakur as Dr. Prashant
 Asrani as Inspector Kumthekar
 Madan Puri as Vikas' Father
 Tarla Mehta as Aarti's mother
 Master Alankar as Raghu
 C.S.Dubey as Banwarilal
 Viju Khote as Havaldar Bachan singh
 Major Anand as Mr.Dave (office colleague of Vikas)
 Shashi Kiran as Dilip (office colleague)
 Akbar Bakshi as the man who haunts Aarti
 Yasmin as nurse
 Madan Kumar

Accolades

Music 
The soundtrack of the film contains 5 songs. The music is composed by R. D. Burman, with lyrics by Gulzar.

"Phir Wahi Raat Hai" is considered to be one of the most loved filmi songs of all time.

References

External links 

1978 films
1970s Hindi-language films
Films about women in India
Films about rape in India
Hindi films remade in other languages
Films scored by R. D. Burman